n5MD is a record label based in Oakland, California. The label was founded by Mike Cadoo in 2000.

n5MD started out as a MiniDisc-only label, the label name meaning "No Fives, Minidiscs!" But when Sony DADC Austria stopped manufacturing pre-recorded MDs, n5MD changed over to CDs, continuing to release a few 7" records and eventually moving to 12". Much of the back catalog is available for purchase in MP3 format from the label's web site.

The label specializes in more emotive styles of contemporary music, with their releases branching between post-rock, post-classical, experimental music and electronica. The label has released over 100 albums to date.

n5MD signed with Redeye Worldwide in October 2017 for North American physical and worldwide digital distribution.

Active roster

 (Ghost)
 Aerosol
 Arovane
 Asonat
 Axel Rigaud
 Boy Is Fiction + Ghosts Of Tyto Alba
 Bvdub
 Dalot
 Daniel McCagh
 Dreissk
 Ex Confusion
 Fall Therapy
 Hollie Kenniff
 ILUITEQ
 Jason van Wyk
 Last Days
 Loess
 Mark Harris
 Miwon
 Near The Parenthesis
 Ocoeur
 Okada
 Porya Hatami And Arovane
 Preghost
 Ruxpin
 Stray Theories
 Suumhow
 Tangent
 To Destroy A City
 Winterlight

Alumni

 Another Electronic Musician
 Arc Lab
 Bavaria
 Bitcrush
 Crisopa
 Dag Rosenqvist
 Damiak
 Diamat
 Dryft
 Eleventhfloorrecords
 Elise Melinand
 Ent
 Funckarma
 Ghost Bike
 Hologram
 Jvox
 Keef Baker
 Lights Out Asia
 Ml
 Plastik Joy
 Port-Royal
 Portland
 Proem
 Run_Return
 Spark
 SubtractiveLAD
 Tim Koch
 Tobias Lilja
 Vcam
 Vesna

See also
 List of record labels
 List of independent record labels
 List of electronic music record labels

References

External links
 Official website

American record labels
Record labels established in 2000
American independent record labels
Classical music record labels
Ambient music record labels
Experimental music record labels
Electronic music record labels
Alternative rock record labels